The Turtles Present the Battle of the Bands is the fourth studio album released by the American rock band the Turtles. Produced by Chip Douglas  (who returned to work with the Turtles after a brief stint shepherding The Monkees' transition into a live band), it was released in November 1968 by White Whale Records. It includes John Barbata's final recorded performances with the band; he left shortly after its release to join Crosby, Stills, Nash & Young. Barbata's eventual replacement, former Spanky and Our Gang drummer John Seiter, also contributed to the album. Some issues of the album were retitled Elenore.

It is a concept album, with the band pretending to be a series of different groups, playing in varying styles.

Music 

The Battle of the Bands is a pop and rock album which encompasses multiple styles of music, including country, psychedelic, and R&B.

As part of the album's concept, The Turtles adopted 12 different band names, and recorded 12 songs, each in a different genre or style, representing different groups competing in a mock Battle of the Bands. The outer cover shows the Turtles in evening dress, playing hosts of the "show", while the inside gatefold shows them in different costumes for each song. The entire album is filled with puns and hidden jokes. (According to liner notes on various Turtles CDs, White Whale Records was in reality, a one-artist label and they were consistently pressuring The Turtles to come up with another "Happy Together," which resulted in "Elenore," a humorous reworking of the classic "happy pop" single.)

"Kamanawanalea" was a made-up Hawaiian idol ("the god of lust and perversion") with a pun name. The lyrics of "Food" included a recipe for brownies, with a special ingredient. "Surfer Dan" was billed as being by The Cross Fires, a nod to the Turtles' previous incarnation as a surf-music band known as The Crossfires before it had signed with White Whale Records. "You Showed Me" was written by Roger McGuinn and Gene Clark of The Byrds, and became the last major Turtles hit. The final song, "Earth Anthem," was recorded at 3:00 A.M. by candlelight, to capture the exact mood the Turtles wanted. "Can't You Hear The Cows" was supposed to be on the album but was rejected by the label for the photo of the band wearing cow heads.

"I'm Chief Kamanawanalea" has been sampled in many tracks, such as "Say No Go" by De La Soul and "Jimmy James" by the Beastie Boys. It was also used in an episode of the TV show "Life on Mars" (US version) in a discotheque scene.

Charts and awards
The album peaked at #128 on the Billboard Pop Albums chart, but its singles were more successful. "Elenore" and "You Showed Me" both reached #6 on the Billboard Pop Singles chart.

Track listing

Personnel
The Turtles
Howard Kaylan - lead vocals
Mark Volman - vocals, special effects
Al Nichol - guitars, organ, piano, Moog synthesizer, vocals
Jim Pons - bass, vocals
Johnny Barbata - drums, percussion, vocals

Additional personnel
Chip Douglas - producer
Jim Hilton - engineer
anonymous - strings, woodwinds, banjo on "Chicken Little Was Right"
Lee Michaels - organ on "Buzzsaw"
Arrangements by The Turtles and Chip Douglas
Album layout designed by The Turtles
Photography by Rod Dyer

References

1968 albums
The Turtles albums
White Whale Records albums
Concept albums